Multi-hop routing (or multihop routing) is a type of communication in radio networks in which network coverage area is larger than radio range of single nodes. Therefore, to reach some destination a node can use other nodes as relays.

Since the transceiver is the major source of power consumption in a radio node and long distance transmission requires high power, in some cases multi-hop routing can be more energy efficient than single-hop routing.

Typical applications of multi-hop routing:
 Wireless sensor networks
 Wireless mesh networks
 Mobile ad hoc networks
 Smart phone ad hoc networks
 Mobile networks with stationary multi-hop relays

References 

Wireless networking